Austrophlebia costalis, the southern giant darner, is a species of dragonfly in the family Telephlebiidae
endemic to eastern Australia.

Austrophlebia costalis is an enormous dark dragonfly with strong yellow markings on its body and a brown band along the leading edge of its wings.
It inhabits streams and may be found on logs in shady areas.

This species is believed to be one of the fastest flying odonates, with an old reference claiming to have clocked one at nearly  but no modern confirmation.

Gallery

See also
 List of Odonata species of Australia

References

Telephlebiidae
Odonata of Australia
Insects of Australia
Endemic fauna of Australia
Taxa named by Robert John Tillyard
Insects described in 1907